The Song of the Road is a 1937 British drama film directed by John Baxter and starring Bransby Williams, Ernest Butcher and Muriel George. It was made at Shepperton Studios. It was made as a supporting feature. Like Baxter's earlier The Song of the Plough (1933) the film examines the effect of modern technology on traditional working practices in the countryside.

Synopsis
After the Local council he works for decides to replace its horse-drawn services with motor vehicles, one of the drivers spends his savings to buy the horse. Together they search the countryside looking for work, and meeting an assorted group of characters on the way.

Cast

References

Bibliography
 Chibnall, Steve. Quota Quickies: The Birth of the British 'B' film. British Film Institute, 2007.
 Low, Rachael. History of the British Film: Filmmaking in 1930s Britain. George Allen & Unwin, 1985 .

External links

1937 films
1937 drama films
British drama films
1930s English-language films
Films directed by John Baxter
Films set in England
Films set in London
Films shot at Shepperton Studios
British black-and-white films
1930s British films